"The Storm Is Over Now" is an international single by American R&B singer R. Kelly from his fourth solo studio album and second sequel to 12 Play, TP-2.com. It is the second single on that album and a 4:35 minute music video has been made for the song. The song was not released in the US, it charted at number 18 on the UK chart and below 15 on two other countries. The song is both written and produced by R. Kelly himself.It was included in the soundtrack to the 2001 film Hardball.

Music video
The music video was directed by R. Kelly and Bille Woodruff.

Charts

Weekly charts

Year-end charts

References

R. Kelly songs
Songs written by R. Kelly
Song recordings produced by R. Kelly
Jive Records singles
Gospel songs
Music videos directed by Bille Woodruff

2001 singles
2001 songs